The eighth season of RuPaul's Drag Race began airing on March 7, 2016. Returning judges include RuPaul and Michelle Visage, along with Ross Mathews and Carson Kressley, who shared judging responsibilities on an alternating basis. Twelve drag queens competed for the title of "America's Next Drag Superstar". The prizes for the winner are a one-year supply of Anastasia Beverly Hills cosmetics and a cash prize of $100,000. The full list of contestants was revealed during the NewNowNext Awards on February 1, 2016. The song "U Wear It Well" from  RuPaul's album Butch Queen was featured in promotion for the show. On March 31, 2016, it was announced LogoTV renewed the show for a ninth season. It was the last season to solely be played on Logo, as the show moved to VH1 for its ninth season.

The theme song played during the runway segment every episode was "The Realness", and the song played during the closing credits was "Die Tomorrow", both songs from the album Realness. 

The winner of the eighth season of RuPaul's Drag Race was Bob the Drag Queen, with Kim Chi and Naomi Smalls being the runners-up, and Cynthia Lee Fontaine being crowned season 8's Miss Congeniality.

On August 20, 2020, Chi Chi DeVayne died after battling scleroderma and pneumonia.

Contestants 

Ages, names, and cities stated are at time of filming.

Notes:

Contestant progress

Lip syncs
Legend:

Guest judges 
Listed in chronological order:
Nicole Richie, television personality
Ester Dean, singer/songwriter
Jamal Sims, choreographer
Lucian Piane, music producer
Faith Evans, singer
Tasha Smith, actress and comedian
Chris Stein, musician
Debbie Harry, singer
Chanel Iman, model
Gigi Hadid, model
Marc Jacobs, fashion designer
Todrick Hall, singer and internet personality
Thomas Roberts, journalist
Vivica A. Fox, actress
Amy Sedaris, comedian and actress
David Sedaris, writer

Special guests

Guests who appeared in episodes, but did not judge on the main stage.

Episode 1:
BeBe Zahara Benet, winner of Season 1 
Tyra Sanchez, winner of Season 2
Raja, winner of Season 3
Sharon Needles, winner of Season 4
Chad Michaels, runner-up of Season 4 and winner of All Stars Season 1
Jinkx Monsoon, winner of Season 5
Violet Chachki, winner of Season 7
Shannel, contestant on Season 1 and All Stars Season 1
Latrice Royale, contestant and Miss Congeniality of Season 4 and contestant on All Stars Season 1 and Season 4
Raven, runner-up of Season 2 and All Stars Season 1
Morgan McMichaels, contestant on Season 2 and All Stars Season 3

Episode 2:
AB Soto, musician
Episode 4:
The Vivienne, RuPaul's Drag Race UK Ambassador
Episode 5:
Charo, musician and comedian
Episode 6:
Marc Snetiker, Entertainment Weekly journalist
Cast of Little Women L.A.
Episode 7:
Andrew Christian, fashion designer
Episode 9:
Jayson Whitmore, director
Bianca Del Rio, winner of Season 6
Episode 10:
BeBe Zahara Benet, winner of Season 1 
Tyra Sanchez, winner of Season 2
Raja, winner of Season 3
Sharon Needles, winner of Season 4
Chad Michaels, runner-up of Season 4 and winner of All Stars Season 1
Jinkx Monsoon, winner of Season 5
Bianca Del Rio, winner of Season 6
Violet Chachki, winner of Season 7
Shangela, contestant on Season 2, Season 3 and All Stars Season 3
Trixie Mattel, contestant on Season 7 and winner of All Stars Season 3
Katya, contestant and Miss Congeniality on Season 7 and runner-up of All Stars Season 2

Episodes

Reception 
In August 2022, Time listed season 8 of RuPaul's Drag Race as among the Top 50 Most Influential Reality TV Seasons.

See also 

 List of Rusicals

References

External links 
 
 Ratings

2016 American television seasons
RuPaul's Drag Race seasons
2016 in LGBT history